The Arkansas Historical Quarterly is the scholarly journal of the Arkansas Historical Association. It publishes articles on the history of Arkansas and is currently edited by Patrick G. Williams (University of Arkansas at Fayetteville).

History
At the initial founding of the Arkansas Historical Association in February 1941, the first task of the society was to begin publication of a journal, financed by a membership fee of $3, on the state's history. D.Y. Thomas was chosen to be the first editor. After securing funds via membership fees, the first issue of the Quarterly was published in March 1942.

References

External links
The Arkansas Historical Quarterly at JSTOR

History of the United States journals
Publications established in 1942
Quarterly journals
English-language journals
1942 establishments in Arkansas